Restrepia sanguinea, the blood red restrepia, is a species of orchid endemic to Venezuela.

References

External links 

sanguinea
Endemic orchids of Venezuela